In enzymology, a diglucosyl diacylglycerol synthase is an enzyme that catalyzes the chemical reaction

UDP-glucose + 1,2-diacyl-3-O-(alpha-D-glucopyranosyl)-sn-glycerol  1,2-diacyl-3-O-(alpha-D-glucopyranosyl(1->2)-O-alpha-D- glucopyranosyl)sn-glycerol + UDP

Thus, the two substrates of this enzyme are UDP-glucose and 1,2-diacyl-3-O-(alpha-D-glucopyranosyl)-sn-glycerol, whereas its 2 products are 1,2-diacyl-3-O-(alpha-D-glucopyranosyl(1-2)-O-alpha-D-glucopyranosyl)sn-glycerol, and UDP.

This enzyme belongs to the family of glycosyltransferases, specifically the hexosyltransferases.  The systematic name of this enzyme class is UDP-glucose:1,2-diacyl-3-O-(alpha-D-glucopyranosyl)-sn-glycerol (1->2) glucosyltransferase. Other names in common use include monoglucosyl diacylglycerol (1->2) glucosyltransferase, MGlcDAG (1->2) glucosyltransferase, and DGlcDAG synthase.  It employs one cofactor, magnesium.

References

 

EC 2.4.1
Magnesium enzymes
Enzymes of unknown structure